"Solid Gold Easy Action" is a song by T. Rex, written by Marc Bolan. It was released as a single on 1 December 1972 and reached No. 2 in the UK Singles Chart. The song did not feature on an original studio album but was included on the 1972 Great Hits compilation album issued by EMI Records. It was beaten to No. 1 in the UK Singles Chart by "Long Haired Lover from Liverpool" by Little Jimmy Osmond (1 week).

Lyrical content

Kerrang! magazine founder Geoff Barton, wrote in an article for Classic Rock magazine that the first two lines of the song, "Life is the same and it always will be / Easy as picking foxes from a tree", appeared to predict Marc Bolan's own death in 1977.  The licence plate of the car Bolan was in during the fatal collision with a tree was FOX 661L. This is one of many supposed 'prophesies' surrounding Marc Bolan's death.

Other versions
 The song was covered by Department S, with backing vocals provided by Thunderthighs as the B-side to the original Demon (D 1003) issue of the "Is Vic There?" single in 1980. Bananarama originally recorded the backing vocals but these were replaced by Thunderthighs on the released version.
 It was covered by The Fratellis in 2007 for the soundtrack of the film Hot Fuzz. 
 Kim Wilde performed the song live during the second leg of her Perfect Girl tour in November 2007. 
 In 2015 the song was used in an Asda advert in the UK. 
 A portion of the song was featured in the third episode of "The Good Guys (2010 TV series)". 
 The song was also included in the movie The Dirt, based on the life and career of the heavy metal band Mötley Crüe.

Track listing
"Solid Gold Easy Action"
"Born to Boogie"

There is a 12-second un-credited spoken intro on the b-side, titled "Xmas Message", which was later called "Xmas Riff" when it was included in the Rhino Singles compilation.

Personnel
Marc Bolan – lead vocals, guitar
Mickey Finn – congas,
Steve Currie – bass guitar
Bill Legend – Drums
 Sue and Sunny – Backing Vocals
Tony Visconti – producer, string arrangement, backing vocals

Chart performance

See also
Bolan's Rock Shrine

References

External links

Lyrics at LyricWiki

1972 singles
T. Rex (band) songs
Songs written by Marc Bolan
Song recordings produced by Tony Visconti